is a passenger railway station in the city of Sanmu, Chiba, Japan, operated by the East Japan Railway Company (JR East).

Lines
Matsuo Station is served by the Sōbu Main Line, and is located 82.5 km from the western terminus of the line at Tokyo Station.

Layout
The station consists of two opposed side platforms connected by a footbridge. The station is staffed.

Platforms

History
Matsuo Station opened on 25 February 1898 as a station on the Sōbu Railway for both passenger and freight operations. On 1 September 1907, the Sōbu Railway was nationalised, becoming part of the Japanese Government Railway (JGR). After World War II, the JGR became the Japanese National Railways (JNR).  The station was absorbed into the JR East network upon the privatization of JNR on 1 April 1987.

Passenger statistics
In fiscal 2019, the station was used by an average of 895 passengers daily (boarding passengers only).

Surrounding area
The station is located in the urban center of the former town of Matsuo.

See also
 List of railway stations in Japan

References

External links

 JR East station information 

Railway stations in Chiba Prefecture
Railway stations in Japan opened in 1898
Sōbu Main Line
Sanmu